Gastrolobium rubrum is a shrub in the family Fabaceae. It is endemic to the south west of Western Australia.

The species grows up to 1.5 metres high and produces red flowers which appear between September and October (spring) in the species' native range.

References

rubrum
Rosids of Western Australia
Endemic flora of Western Australia
Taxa named by Michael Crisp